"Passenger Fatty-Seven" is the tenth episode of the fifteenth season of the animated sitcom Family Guy, and the 279th episode overall. It aired on Fox in the United States on January 8, 2017, and is written by Alex Carter and directed by Greg Colton. The story follows Quagmire flying his friends to San Francisco, and as they go home, they are soon ambushed by a group of Eastern European terrorists hijacking their plane, causing Quagmire to put his ex-Navy piloting skills to the test.

This episode was dedicated in memory of cast member Carrie Fisher, who died on December 27, 2016, after going into cardiac arrest while on a flight to Los Angeles on December 23, 2016. A slide showing her picture with the words "In Loving Memory" on top and "Carrie Fisher 1956–2016" below was shown before the start of the episode.

Plot
At the Drunken Clam, Glenn Quagmire meets with Peter Griffin, Cleveland Brown and Joe Swanson and tells them that he can get a discount for friends and family and bring them along on a trip, so they plan on going to San Francisco. They steal a cab meant for Lois who was originally going to a timeshare hosted by Donna Tubbs' sister Janet with Donna and Bonnie Swanson. As Peter unknowingly grabbed Lois's suitcase, Lois finds a sex doll resembling her in the suitcase as Lois commented that Peter was "bringing her" in the suitcase. When they arrive in San Francisco, they do random stuff like riding Segways and getting 'lesbian' haircuts while checking out the sights and Peter even sits on Stephen Curry's lap.

When the trip ends, Quagmire gives them a tour of the plane, where they soon accuse Quagmire of goofing off while the plane was on autopilot which he claims to use while taking breaks. Quagmire takes offense to that and kicks them out of the cockpit. While flying, the plane gets hijacked by 3 terrorists from an unidentified Eastern European country who jam the frequency. The terrorists explain that they are going to punish America for supporting the other side of the unidentified Eastern European country in the civil war (implied it is Ukraine and the civil war is likely the War in Donbass). This hijacking is covered on the news by Tom Tucker and is watched by the Griffins, the Swansons, the Browns and Ida Quagmire.

Quagmire refuses to allow the terrorists entry to the cockpit, even when Peter is threatened at gunpoint. Joe and Cleveland decide to take matters into their own hands by going down to the cargo hold and retrieve a gun from Joe's bag. One of the terrorists discovers this and heads down to the basement with Peter as a human shield. Joe opens the landing gear, but Peter gets caught with the terrorist and they have a fight on the landing gear. Just as the two are about to make peace while flying over Yosemite National Park, Cleveland manages to hit the terrorist off as he falls to a watery grave into the river below.

When the trio go back up and knock out the remaining terrorists, they are hailed as heroes. When Quagmire comes out to congratulate them and informs everyone that the plane will land in Nevada, an additional terrorist (the mastermind and ringleader of the hijacking team, who was also in reserve just in case the plan went awry) posing as a businessman hijacks the plane where he plans to crash it into Las Vegas' biggest hotel with Rita Rudner in it. Before the plan is carried out, Quagmire uses a barrel roll to subdue the terrorist. Unfortunately, Quagmire gets angry at the passengers for not following the "Please Fasten Seatbelt" light that was turned on ("Oh come on. Doesn't anyone pay attention to the sign?"). However, F/A-18 Hornet fighter jets appear unaware that the hijackers have been taken care of. The plane is shot in its right wing, but a determined Quagmire manages to land the plane in a large lake and keep everyone safe.

As the passengers and co-pilot are tended by the EMTs and the damaged plane taken care of by the firefighters and the three remaining terrorists are also arrested by the FBI (with the police in tow and the media covering the averted crisis as well), Peter, Cleveland, and Joe thank Quagmire for saving them and apologize for judging his flight actions. Just then, a military plane comes with the guys' respective families to reunite with them. Peter and Chris have a chat about some of the charges Chris found on Peter's card from their time in San Francisco and suggests he keep some of his purchases private. As the various families plan to head back to Quahog and put the recent event behind them, Peter breaks the fourth wall and tells the audience "Oh, yeah, in case we didn't say, this was Spirit Airlines."

The episode received an audience of 4.00 million viewers, an increase from the previous episode, and making it the third most-watched show of the night, behind Son of Zorn and The Simpsons.

References

External links

2017 American television episodes
Family Guy (season 15) episodes
Television episodes set in San Francisco